USS Willard Keith has been the name of more than one United States Navy ship, and may refer to:

 , a destroyer escort cancelled in 1943 prior to completion
 , a destroyer escort cancelled in 1944 prior to completion
 , a destroyer in commission from 1944 to 1972

United States Navy ship names